Razzmatazz (stylized in all caps; sometimes as RΛZZMΛTΛZZ) is the debut studio album by American musical duo I Dont Know How But They Found Me. It was originally set to be released by Fearless Records on October 16, 2020, but was pushed back to October 23, 2020 due to the COVID-19 pandemic.

Promotion 
Over two years prior to the album's release, the song "Nobody Likes The Opening Band" was released as a free download on their website on March 14, 2018, accompanied with a music video. On August 5, 2020, the band released a lyric video for the album's lead single "Leave Me Alone" along with the announcement of the album's title and release date. On September 16, the title track "Razzmatazz" and accompanying lyric video were released. Following a video on October 1 explaining the need to push back the album, the band released the third single "New Invention" the next day alongside a lyric video. 

The band continued promoting the album long after release and performed "Leave Me Alone" on Jimmy Kimmel Live! the following January and on The Ellen DeGeneres Show in February. For Record Store Day 2021, the band released Razzmatazz B-Sides as an exclusive picture disc. This EP included one new track: "Mx. Sinister", a cover of "Debra" by Beck, and reimagined versions of "Leave Me Alone" and "Modern Day Cain".

On November 19th, the band released Razzmatazz: Deluxe Edition. Included in the bonus tracks were a cover of "Boys Don't Cry" by The Cure, a revision of "New Invention" featuring Tessa Violet, various live performances of tracks from Razzmatazz, and material previously only found on their limited B-Side release.

Starting in mid-2021 the band toured internationally to support the album and were featured in various festivals. The tour was split into two parts: "The Razzmatazz Tour" (late 2021) and "The Thought Reform Tour" (early 2022).

Critical reception 

Razzmatazz received positive reviews from music critics. On Metacritic, which assigns a normalized rating out of 100 from reviews from critics, the album has an average score of 84, which indicates "universal acclaim" based on 4 reviews. DIY described the album as "melding together '80s synths, baroque piano and pithy, self-deprecating choruses", while adding that it is "fun, flamboyant, and entirely of its time". The Line of Best Fit praised frontman Dallon Weekes' lyricism in the songs "Mad IQs" and "Clusterhug", as well as his bass guitar work in "Sugar Pills" and "New Invention".

Track listing

Personnel 
I Dont Know How But They Found Me
 Dallon Weekes – vocals and bass (all tracks), synthesizer (1, 2, 4–10, 12); piano (3, 9, 10, 12), ukulele (11), production 
 Ryan Seaman – drums (except tracks 3 and 11), percussion 

Additional personnel
 Ian Walsh – guitar (except tracks 3, 7 and 11)
 Stu Maxfield – guitar (track 7)
 Alex Nauth – trumpet (track 5)
 Matt Appleton – saxophone (track 12)

Production 

Tim Pagnotta – engineering and production
Brian Phillips – engineering and production

Charts

Release history

Notes

References

2020 debut albums
Fearless Records albums
I Dont Know How But They Found Me albums